ICCN is an initialism for:

 Institut Congolais pour la Conservation de la Nature
 International Conference on Computational Nanoscience and Nanotechnology
 Interfaith Climate Change Network
 Indiana Classic Car Network or Illinois Classic Car Network
 International Center on Conflict and Negotiation
 Inner City Computer Network
 Intercultural Conflict, Communication and Negotiation